Misery is the fifth EP by Canadian grindcore band Fuck the Facts. The EP was released on October 10, 2011, in conjunction with their album Die Miserable. The EP is limited to 500 hand-numbered copies on CD, 100 cassettes, and is also available as a digital download.

Track listing

Personnel

Fuck the Facts
Topon Das – guitar, mixing, mastering
Mel Mongeon – vocals, artwork
Mathieu Vilandré – drums, guitar, vocals
Marc Bourgon – bass, guitar, vocals
Johnny Ibay – guitar

Additional musicians
Jesse Matthewson – vocals on "Running the Wolverine's Gauntlet"
Elliot Desgagnés – vocals on "Inside Out"
Leigh Newton – guitar noise on "Smooth Beige"

Production
Martin Cleal – recording

Recording
The album was recorded at Apartment 2 Studios by the band and Martin Cleal in November 2010. The album was then mixed and mastered by Topon Das in June 2011.

References

2011 EPs
Fuck the Facts albums